Li Haisheng (born 2 January 1964) is a Chinese wrestler. He competed in the men's Greco-Roman 48 kg at the 1984 Summer Olympics.

References

External links
 

1964 births
Living people
Chinese male sport wrestlers
Olympic wrestlers of China
Wrestlers at the 1984 Summer Olympics
Place of birth missing (living people)
Asian Games medalists in wrestling
Wrestlers at the 1986 Asian Games
Asian Games silver medalists for China
Medalists at the 1986 Asian Games
21st-century Chinese people
20th-century Chinese people